George James Finch-Hatton, 11th Earl of Winchilsea and 6th Earl of Nottingham (31 May 1815 – 9 June 1887), styled Viscount Maidstone between 1826 and 1857, was a British peer and Tory politician.

Early life
Winchilsea in May 1815 and was the son of George Finch-Hatton, 10th Earl of Winchilsea and 5th Earl of Nottingham (1791–1858) and his first wife Lady Georgiana Charlotte (died 1835), daughter of James Graham, 3rd Duke of Montrose (1755–1836).

Career

Winchilsea was elected as a Member of Parliament (MP) for Northamptonshire North in 1837, a seat he held until 1841. In 1858 he succeeded his father in the earldom and entered the House of Lords.

Estates
In the mid-1860s, Lord Winchilsea experienced serious financial difficulties, which eventually forced him to leave his property at Eastwell Park in Kent. On 4 December 1868, trustees appointed under the Winchilsea Estate Act (1865) entered into a contract to let Eastwell Park, together with its furnishings and effects, to the Duke of Abercorn for a period of five years. Lord Winchilsea had been obliged to vacate the property some time prior to December 1868, and he was formally adjudged bankrupt on 5 October 1870. Eastwell was next occupied by Prince Alfred, Duke of Edinburgh, the second son of Queen Victoria.

Personal life
Lord Winchilsea was married twice. In 1846, he married Lady Constance Henrietta (1823 – 1878), daughter of Henry Paget, 2nd Marquess of Anglesey. They had one son and three daughters.

 Lady Mabel Emily Finch-Hatton (1849–1872), who married William George Eden, 4th Baron Auckland (1829–1890)
 Lady Constance Eleanora Caroline Finch-Hatton (1851–1910), who married Hon. Frederick Charles Howard (1840–1893), the son of Henry Howard, 2nd Earl of Effingham.
 George Finch-Hatton, Viscount Maidstone (1852–1879), died aged 27 with no children
 Lady Hilda Jane Sophia Finch-Hatton (1856–1893), who married Henry Vincent Higgins (d. 1928)

After her death in March 1878, he married his first wife's first cousin, Lady Elizabeth Georgiana (died 1904), daughter of Francis Conyngham, 2nd Marquess Conyngham, in 1882. There were no children from this marriage.

Lord Winchilsea died in June 1887, aged 72. As his only son, George Finch-Hatton, Viscount Maidstone, had predeceased him, he was succeeded in his titles by his half-brother, Murray Finch-Hatton. Lady Winchilsea died in February 1904. Lord Winchilsea, his son and his second wife are buried in the cemetery of the now ruined church of St Mary the Virgin at Eastwell Park.

Descendants
Through his daughter, Lady Constance, he was the grandfather of Gordon Howard, 5th Earl of Effingham (1873–1946), who married Rosamond Margaret Hudson and later, Madeleine Foshay, and Capt. Hon. Algernon George Mowbray Frederick Howard (1874–1950). Through his grandson, the 5th Earl of Effingham, he was the great-grandfather of Mowbray Howard, 6th Earl of Effingham (1905–1996), Hon. John Algernon Frederick Charles Howard (1907–1970), and Hon. Nicholas Howard (1919–2016).

References
Notes

Sources

External links 
 

1815 births
1887 deaths
11
706
Members of the Parliament of the United Kingdom for English constituencies
UK MPs 1837–1841
UK MPs who inherited peerages
George